Naioree (Bengali: নাইওরী, also Naiory, Nā'i'ōrī, new bride who went to father’s home from bridegroom’s home first time after marry) is a 2001 Bangladeshi telefilm written by Shakoor Majid, directed by Toukir Ahmed and produced by Protune Entertainment.

Plot
The old love story in a village named Birampur. Some piper who flute under the banyan tree. He has no parents. A village leader bring him to his house. His daughter fall in love. The villagers come to know this matter and blamed his family. He told the piper to leave his house. But he lose his leadership. His daughter sent to his aunt house and got married a second wife. She shared her love story with his husband. His husband got married only for a child. When his first wife become expected then he accepted this matter. Once her mother-in-law asked if she want to go father’s home. Then she send a letter through a beggar to his brother. Her brother came to meet her. He told that for prestige issue parents told to the villagers their daughter died. Then she refused to go parental home. Last she met her lover who become a rural singer.

Cast

Soundtrack

The film is scored by Jasim Uddin, Radha Ramana, Hosne Ara Jolly and several artists have rendered the songs.

References

2001 films
2001 drama films
Bengali-language Bangladeshi films
English-language Bangladeshi films
Bangladeshi musical drama films